Sagephora subcarinata is a species of moth in the family Tineidae. It was described by Edward Meyrick in 1931. This species is endemic to New Zealand.

References

External links
Image of type specimen of Sagephora subcarinata.

Moths described in 1931
Tineidae
Moths of New Zealand
Endemic fauna of New Zealand
Taxa named by Edward Meyrick
Endemic moths of New Zealand